Maharshi Dayanand University, also called M.D. University or simply MDU, is a university in Rohtak, Haryana, India. Established in 1976 and named after the saint Dayananda Saraswati.

Maharshi Dayanand University, ab initio established as Rohtak University, Rohtak, came into existence by Act No. 25 of 1975 of the Haryana Legislative Assembly in 1976 with the objective to promote inter-disciplinary higher education and research in the fields of environmental, ecological and life sciences. It was rechristened as Maharshi Dayanand University in 1977 after the name of a great visionary and social reformer, Maharshi Dayanand. It had a unitary and residential character in its nascent stage, but became an affiliating university in November 1978. The university secured the recognition of University Grants Commission – the higher education regulatory body of India – for central government grants on 16 March 1979.

History

While Kurukshetra University was the only state university at the time of formation of the state of Haryana in 1966, with partial affiliation of state colleges with Panjab University. Later, deaffiliation of Haryana colleges from Panjab University and growing needs of higher education in Haryana, the new University of Rohtak was established at the erstwhile regional center of Punjab University at Rohtak. Later the university was renamed as Maharishi Dayanand University. A large, lush green 700-acre main campus was established for the needs of the University at Delhi Road.

A former satellite campus, the Indira Gandhi Post Graduate Regional Center in Rewari, was awarded university status on its own (as Indira Gandhi University) in April 2013.

Academics 
MDU offers an undergraduate arts and engineering programs that awards a Bachelor of Engineering (BE) or Bachelor of Technology (B.Tech.) degree. The university also offers postgraduate programs that lead to Master of Technology (M.Tech.), Master of Science (MSc) by research, Master of Business Administration (MBA), Master of Computer Applications (MCA) and doctorate (Ph.D.). The MSc and PhD are research degrees while the rest are taught degrees.

Accreditation
The university was accredited by the National Assessment and Accreditation Council in 2019 with a grade of A+ at CGPA 3.44 out of overall 4.00.

Rankings

Maharshi Dayanand University was ranked 93 among universities in India by the National Institutional Ranking Framework (NIRF) ranking in 2022 and 101–150 overall.

Notable alumni
 Arvind Kumar Sharma, Member of Parliament (Rohtak Constituency)
 Sakshi Malik, Olympic Bronze Medalist  
 Jaideep Ahlawat, Bollywood Actor 
 Geeta Phogat, Freestyle Wrestler 
 Pawan Kumar, Freestyle Wrestler

See also
 State University of Performing And Visual Arts
 State Institute of Film and Television

References

External links 
 

Education in Rohtak
Universities in Haryana
 
1976 establishments in India
Educational institutions established in 1976